Klias River Kadazan is an Austronesian language of Sabah, Malaysia.

References

Dusunic languages
Languages of Malaysia
Endangered Austronesian languages